The seventh competition weekend of the 2010–11 ISU Speed Skating World Cup was held in Salt Lake City, United States, on February 18–19, 2011.

Martina Sáblíková of the Czech Republic set a new world record on the women's 5000 metres.

Schedule of events
The schedule of the event is below:

Medal summary

Men's events

Women's events

References

7
Isu World Cup, 2010-11, 7
Sports in Salt Lake City
ISU Speed Skating